This is a list of Swedish television related events from 2014.

Events
9 May - Singer Benjamin Wahlgren Ingrosso and his partner Sigrid Bernson win the ninth season of Let's Dance.
18 May - 27-year-old singer and  Jon Henrik Fjällgren wins the sixth season of Talang Sverige.
5 December - Lisa Ajax wins the tenth season of Idol.
11 December - Anders Olsson wins season three of the Scandinavian version of Big Brother for Sweden, becoming the show's first male winner.

Debuts
24 February - Talang Sverige (2007-2011, 2014–present)
31 August - The Scandinavian version of Big Brother (2005-2006, 2014–present)

Television shows

2000s
Idol (2004-2011, 2013–present)
Let's Dance (2006–present)

2010s
1-24 December - Piratskattens hemlighet

Ending this year

Births

See also
2014 in Sweden

Deaths

References